Cherono Koech (born 8 December 1992) is a Kenyan middle-distance runner. She was born in Kericho. At the 2012 Summer Olympics, she competed in the Women's 800 metres.

References

External links
 

1992 births
Living people
Kenyan female middle-distance runners
Olympic athletes of Kenya
Athletes (track and field) at the 2012 Summer Olympics
Commonwealth Games competitors for Kenya
Athletes (track and field) at the 2010 Commonwealth Games
People from Kericho County